The Armed Forces Chaplains Board (AFCB) is an organizational entity within the United States Department of Defense established to advise the Secretary of Defense and the Under Secretary of Defense for Personnel and Readiness on religious, ethical, and moral matters, in addition to a number of policy issues affecting religious ministry and the support of the free exercise of religion within the military services. It is made up of the three Chiefs of Chaplains and three active-duty Deputy Chiefs of Chaplains of the Army, Navy, and Air Force.

Composition and Leadership
The Chair of the AFCB is a position rotated among the three services, with the Chief of Chaplains appointed as Chair for a period of eighteen months.  In addition a senior military chaplain holding the rank of O-6 (Army or Air Force Colonel or Navy Captain) serves as the AFCB Executive Director for a three-year term.  According to the Department of Defense Instruction governing the Board, it is recommended that the Executive Director not be serving in the same branch of the Armed Forces as the current Chair, but not required.

Military chaplains of specific religious faiths may be appointed to serve as special consultants to the AFCB on issues concerning those faiths, and the Board may establish committees to conduct studies, make recommendations, "or otherwise assist the Board in carrying out its responsibilities."

Policy Advice
The AFCB is tasked to provide advice on issues including:
Protection of free exercise of religion
Procurement, professional standards, requirements, training, and assignment of military chaplains
Religious support providers
Procurement and utilization of supplies, equipment, and facilities for religious use
Promotion of dialog with civilian organizations regarding religious issues
Promotion of joint military endeavors for the delivery of ministry by the Military Services throughout the Department of Defense.

Current AFCB Members

Executive Directors
The current executive director is: CH (LT COL) Dale Marlowe (Air Force); previously, CH (CAPT) William Riley (Navy), CH (COL) Jay Johns (Army), CH (CAPT) Jere Hinson (Navy), CH (COL) Jerry Pitts (Air Force), CH (COL) Steve Moon (Army), CH (COL) Thomas E. Preston (Army).

See also
Chiefs of Chaplains of the United States
Military chaplain
Chaplain
Armed Forces Chaplaincy Center
United States military chaplain symbols

References

External links
Joint Publication 1-05: Religious Affairs in Joint Operations. 13 November 2009. United States Joint Forces Command (lead agent and JS doctrine sponsor for this publication: Office of Religious Affairs)

United States Department of Defense agencies
United States
Religion in the United States military